The 18th Satellite Awards ceremony, honoring the year's outstanding performers, films, television shows, home videos and interactive media, was presented by the International Press Academy at the Hyatt Regency Century Plaza in Century City, Los Angeles, as part of the 2013–14 film awards season.

The nominations were announced on December 2, 2013. The winners were announced on February 23, 2014.

Special achievement awards
Auteur Award (for singular vision and unique artistic control over the elements of production) – Guillermo del Toro

Mary Pickford Award (for outstanding contribution to the entertainment industry) – Mike Medavoy

Nikola Tesla Award (for visionary achievement in filmmaking technology) – Garrett Brown

Honorary Satellite Award – Ryan Coogler (Fruitvale Station)

Independent Producer of the Year Award – Gabrielle Tana

Newcomer Award – Michael B. Jordan (Fruitvale Station) and Sophie Nélisse (The Book Thief)

Motion picture winners and nominees

Winners are listed first and highlighted in bold.

Television winners and nominees

Winners are listed first and highlighted in bold.

{|class=wikitable style="width="100%"
|-
! style="background:#EEDD82;" | Best Drama Series
! style="background:#EEDD82;" | Best Musical or Comedy Series
|-
| valign="top" |
Breaking Bad – AMCThe Americans – FX
Downton Abbey – PBS
The Good Wife – CBS
Homeland – Showtime
House of Cards – Netflix
Last Tango in Halifax – BBC One / PBS
Mad Men – AMC
Masters of Sex – Showtime
Rectify – Sundance Channel
| valign="top" |Orange Is the New Black – NetflixAlpha House – Amazon Studios
The Big Bang Theory – CBS
Brooklyn Nine-Nine – Fox
Enlightened – HBO
Modern Family – ABC
Veep – HBO
The Wrong Mans – BBC Two / Hulu
A Young Doctor's Notebook – Sky Arts
|-
! style="background:#EEDD82;" | Best Miniseries or TV Film
! style="background:#EEDD82;" | Best Genre Series
|-
| valign="top" |Dancing on the Edge – StarzBehind the Candelabra – HBO
The Big C: Hereafter – Showtime
Burton & Taylor – BBC America
Generation War – ZDF
Mob City – TNT
Parade's End – HBO
Phil Spector – HBO
Top of the Lake – Sundance Channel
The White Queen – Starz
| valign="top" |Game of Thrones – HBOAmerican Horror Story: Coven – FX
Arrow – The CW
Grimm – NBC
Agents of S.H.I.E.L.D. – ABC
Once Upon a Time – ABC
Orphan Black – Space
The Returned – Sundance Channel
Supernatural – The CW
The Walking Dead – AMC
|-
! style="background:#EEDD82;" | Best Actor in a Drama Series
! style="background:#EEDD82;" | Best Actress in a Drama Series
|-
| valign="top" |Bryan Cranston – Breaking Bad as Walter WhiteJeff Daniels – The Newsroom as Will McAvoy
Jon Hamm – Mad Men as Don Draper
Freddie Highmore – Bates Motel as Norman Bates
Derek Jacobi – Last Tango in Halifax as Alan Buttershaw
Michael Sheen – Masters of Sex as Dr. William H. Masters
Kevin Spacey – House of Cards as Frank Underwood
Aden Young – Rectify as Daniel Holden
| valign="top" |Robin Wright – House of Cards as Claire UnderwoodLizzy Caplan – Masters of Sex as Virginia E. Johnson
Olivia Colman – Broadchurch as Detective Sergeant Ellie Miller
Vera Farmiga – Bates Motel as Norma Louise Bates
Tatiana Maslany – Orphan Black as Various Characters
Anne Reid – Last Tango in Halifax as Celia Dawson
Keri Russell – The Americans as Elizabeth Jennings
Abigail Spencer – Rectify as Amantha Holden
|-
! style="background:#EEDD82;" | Best Actor in a Musical or Comedy Series
! style="background:#EEDD82;" | Best Actress in a Musical or Comedy Series
|-
| valign="top" |John Goodman – Alpha House as Senator Gil John BiggsMathew Baynton – The Wrong Mans as Sam Pinkett
Andre Braugher – Brooklyn Nine-Nine as Captain Ray Holt
Don Cheadle – House of Lies as Marty Kaan
James Corden – The Wrong Mans as Phil Bourne
Jake Johnson – New Girl as Nick Miller
Jim Parsons – The Big Bang Theory as Dr. Sheldon Cooper
| valign="top" |Taylor Schilling – Orange Is the New Black as Piper ChapmanLaura Dern – Enlightened as Amy Jellicoe
Zooey Deschanel – New Girl as Jessica "Jess" Day
Lena Dunham – Girls as Hannah Horvath
Edie Falco – Nurse Jackie as Jackie Payton, RN
Julia Louis-Dreyfus – Veep as Vice President Selina Meyer
Amy Poehler – Parks and Recreation as Leslie Knope
Jessica Walter – Arrested Development as Lucille Bluth
|-
! style="background:#EEDD82;" | Best Actor in a Miniseries or TV Film
! style="background:#EEDD82;" | Best Actress in a Miniseries or TV Film
|-
| valign="top" |Michael Douglas – Behind the Candelabra as LiberaceMatt Damon – Behind the Candelabra as Scott Thorson
Benedict Cumberbatch – Parade's End as Christopher Tietjens
Chiwetel Ejiofor – Dancing on the Edge as Louis Lester
Matthew Goode – Dancing on the Edge as Stanley Mitchell
Peter Mullan – Top of the Lake as Matt Mitcham
Al Pacino – Phil Spector as Phil Spector
Dominic West – Burton & Taylor as Richard Burton
| valign="top" |Elisabeth Moss – Top of the Lake as Det. Robin GriffinHelena Bonham Carter – Burton & Taylor as Elizabeth Taylor
Holliday Grainger – Bonnie and Clyde as Bonnie Parker
Rebecca Hall – Parade's End as Sylvia Tietjens
Jessica Lange – American Horror Story: Coven as Fiona Goode
Melissa Leo – Call Me Crazy: A Five Film as Robin
Helen Mirren – Phil Spector as Linda Kenney Baden
Sarah Paulson – American Horror Story: Coven as Cordelia Foxx
|-
! style="background:#EEDD82;" | Best Supporting Actor in a Series, Miniseries or TV Film
! style="background:#EEDD82;" | Best Supporting Actress in a Series, Miniseries or TV Film
|-
| valign="top" |Aaron Paul – Breaking Bad as Jesse PinkmanNikolaj Coster-Waldau – Game of Thrones as Jaime Lannister
William Hurt – Bonnie and Clyde: Dead and Alive as Frank Hamer
Peter Sarsgaard – The Killing as Ray Seward
Jimmy Smits – Sons of Anarchy as Nero Padilla
Corey Stoll – House of Cards as Peter Russo
Jon Voight – Ray Donovan as Mickey Donovan
James Wolk – Mad Men as Bob Benson
| valign="top" |Laura Prepon – Orange Is the New Black as Alex VauseUzo Aduba – Orange Is the New Black as Suzanne "Crazy Eyes" Warren
Kathy Bates – American Horror Story: Coven as Delphine LaLaurie
Emilia Clarke – Game of Thrones as Daenerys Targaryen
Anna Gunn – Breaking Bad as Skyler White
Margo Martindale – The Americans as Claudia
Judy Parfitt – Call the Midwife as Sister Monica Joan
Merritt Wever – Nurse Jackie as Zoey Barkow, RN
|-
! style="background:#EEDD82;" | Best Ensemble – Television Series
! style="background:#EEDD82;" | Best Original Short-Format Program
|-
| valign="top" |Orange Is the New Black
Jason Biggs
Michael J. Harney
Michelle Hurst
Kate Mulgrew
Laura Prepon
Taylor Schilling
| valign="top" |
JustSaying – Tuna Fish StudioAsk A Slave – AzieDee Productions
Blue – WIGS
Burning Love – Abominable Pictures / Paramount Insurge / Red Hour Films / Yahoo! Screen
EastSiders – Logo TV
Ghost Ghirls – Electric Dynamite / Shine America / Yahoo! Screen
High Maintenance – Janky Clown Productions
Little Horribles – Barnacle Studious
|}

New Media winners and nominees
{| class=wikitable style="width="100%"
|-
! style="background:#EEDD82;" | Outstanding Overall Blu-ray/DVD
! style="background:#EEDD82;" | Outstanding Youth Blu-ray/DVD
|-
| valign="top" |Star Trek Into Darkness (Paramount Home Entertainment)Les Misérables (Universal Studios Home Entertainment)
The Wizard of Oz: 75th Anniversary Collector's Edition (Warner Home Video)
Waiting for Lightning (First Run Features)
Breaking Bad: The Complete Series	(Sony Pictures Home Entertainment)
JFK: 50th Anniversary Ultimate Collector's Edition (Warner Home Video)
To Be or Not To Be (United Artists)
Love Actually: 10th Anniversary Edition (Universal Studios Home Entertainment)
The Talented Mr. Ripley (Miramax Films)
Argo (Warner Home Video)
| valign="top" |Rise of the Guardians (Paramount Home Entertainment / DreamWorks Animation Home Entertainment)Planes (Walt Disney Studios Home Entertainment)
 Monsters University: Collector's Edition (Walt Disney Studios Home Entertainment)
 The Smurfs 2 (Sony Pictures Home Entertainment)
 The Croods (20th Century Fox Home Entertainment / DreamWorks Animation Home Entertainment)
The Muppet Movie (Walt Disney Studios Home Entertainment)
|-
! style="background:#EEDD82;" | Outstanding Platform Action/Adventure Game
! style="background:#EEDD82;" | Outstanding Mobile Game
|-
| valign="top" |Battlefield 4 (EA Digital Illusions CE)Beyond: Two Souls (Quantic Dream)
BioShock Infinite (Irrational Games)
Crysis 3 (Crytek)
Grand Theft Auto V (Rockstar North)
| valign="top" |Badland (Frogmind)XCOM: Enemy Unknown for iOS (Feral Interactive / Firaxis Games)
Warhammer Quest (Rodeo Games)
The Room (Fireproof Games)
Ridiculous Fishing (Vlambeer)
|-
! style="background:#EEDD82;" | Outstanding Role Playing Game
! style="background:#EEDD82;" | Outstanding Sports/Racing Game
|-
| valign="top" |Ni no Kuni: Wrath of the White Witch (Level-5 / Studio Ghibli)Tales of Xillia (Namco Tales Studio)
Final Fantasy XIV: A Realm Reborn (Square Enix)
Sacred 3 (Keen Games)
The Elder Scrolls V: Skyrim (Bethesda Game Studios)
| valign="top" |Need for Speed Rivals (Electronic Arts / Ghost Games)NBA 2K14 (Visual Concepts)
Grid 2 (Codemasters Southam)
Forza Motorsport 5 (Turn 10 Studios)
FIFA 14 (EA Canada)
|}

Awards breakdown

Film
Winners:3 / 8 Gravity: Best Original Score / Best Sound (Editing and Mixing) / Best Visual Effects
2 / 2 Dallas Buyers Club: Best Actor / Best Supporting Actor
2 / 3 The Great Gatsby: Best Art Direction and Production Design / Best Original Song
2 / 3 Nebraska: Best Supporting Actress / Best Ensemble – Motion Picture
2 / 8 American Hustle: Best Original Screenplay / Best Film Editing
2 / 10 12 Years a Slave: Best Director / Best Film
1 / 1 Blackfish: Best Documentary Film
1 / 1 The Broken Circle Breakdown: Best Foreign Language Film
1 / 1 The Wind Rises: Best Animated or Mixed Media Film
1 / 2 The Invisible Woman: Best Costume Design
1 / 4 Philomena: Best Adapted Screenplay
1 / 5 Blue Jasmine: Best Actress
1 / 6 Inside Llewyn Davis: Best Cinematography

Losers:
0 / 7 Rush
0 / 6 Saving Mr. Banks
0 / 5 Captain Phillips, The Wolf of Wall Street
0 / 4 All Is Lost
0 / 3 Blue Is the Warmest Colour, The Butler, Oz the Great and Powerful, Prisoners
0 / 2 August: Osage County, The Book Thief, The Croods, Enough Said, Frozen, Her, The Secret Life of Walter Mitty

Television
Winners:
4 / 5 Orange Is the New Black: Best Actress in a Musical or Comedy Series / Best Musical or Comedy Series / Best Supporting Actress in a Series, Miniseries or TV Film
3 / 4 Breaking Bad: Best Actor in a Drama Series / Best Drama Series / Best Supporting Actor in a Series, Miniseries or TV Film
1 / 2 Alpha House: Best Actor in a Musical or Comedy Series
1 / 3 Behind the Candelabra: Best Actor in a Miniseries or TV Film
1 / 3 Dancing on the Edge: Best Miniseries or TV Film
1 / 3 Game of Thrones: Best Genre Series
1 / 3 Top of the Lake: Best Actress in a Miniseries or TV Film
1 / 4 House of Cards: Best Actress in a Drama Series

Losers:
0 / 4 American Horror Story: Coven
0 / 3 The Americans, Burton & Taylor, Last Tango in Halifax, Mad Men, Masters of Sex, Parade's End, Phil Spector, Rectify, The Wrong Mans
0 / 2 Bates Motel, The Big Bang Theory, Bonnie and Clyde, Brooklyn Nine-Nine, Enlightened, New Girl, Nurse Jackie, Orphan Black, Veep

References

External links
 International Press Academy website

Satellite Awards ceremonies
2013 film awards
2013 television awards
2013 video game awards